"Walk Away Renée" is a song written by Michael Brown, Bob Calilli, and Tony Sansone for the band the Left Banke, released as a single in July 1966. Steve Martin Caro is featured on lead vocals. It spent 13 weeks on the US charts, with a top spot of No. 5. The song has been widely considered a quintessence of the baroque pop genre. As musician Marshall Crenshaw explained, "There's something about 'Walk Away Renee' that's one of the most powerful songs I've ever heard, just in terms of provoking an emotional reaction."

In 2005, Rolling Stone placed it at No. 220 in the 500 Greatest Songs of All Time. The track returned to nationwide charts with cover versions by The Four Tops (1967) and Rick Price (1993).

Background
Michael Brown has stated that the song is one of a number he wrote about Renée Fladen (later Fladen-Kamm), the then-girlfriend of the Left Banke's bassist Tom Finn and object of Brown's affection. She was associated with the band for a few weeks, and was described as a free-spirited and tall blonde. Brown wrote it one month after he met her.  "Walk Away Renée" was one of a series of love songs the infatuated Brown wrote for his muse. Other works about her include the band's second hit "Pretty Ballerina" and "She May Call You Up Tonight".  After decades of obscurity, she was identified in 2001 as a noted singer, vocal teacher, and artist on the West Coast.

According to band member Tom Finn:

Brown says of his unrequited love for Renée:

Renée was looking on during the recording of the song, and her presence nearly prevented its completion. In an interview, Brown stated:

However, co-writer Tony Sansone has given a different version of the origin of the song and contends that he is the primary writer. Sansone has stated in interviews that he wrote the lyrics, and he randomly chose the name Renée because the Beatles used the name "Michelle" in their hit song of the same name; he likewise chose a French name, Renée.

Composition
The song features a flute solo played during the instrumental bridge of the middle portion of the song. Brown got the idea for the flute solo from the Mamas & the Papas song "California Dreamin'" which had been recorded in November 1965, but was not an immediate hit until early 1966. The arrangement for "Walk Away Renée " also includes a lush string orchestration, a jangling harpsichord part, and a descending chromatic bass melody. Its production was credited to World United Productions, Inc., but the session was produced by brothers Bill and Steve Jerome, along with Brown's father, jazz and classical violinist Harry Lookofsky, who also led the string players. The session took place in March 1966.

Personnel
Musicians
 Al Rogers — drums
 John Abbott — bass
 George (Fluffer) Hirsh — guitar
 Mike Brown — harpsichord
 Friends — strings
 Jackie Kelso [uncredited] — flute
 John Abbott – arranger
 Steve Martin Caro — lead vocal
 George Cameron & Tom Finn — backing vocals

Technical
 Steve Jerome — engineer
 Harry Lookofsky — producer, strings
 Steve Jerome — producer
 Bill Jerome — producer

Chart performance

Weekly charts

Year-end charts

Four Tops cover

The Four Tops' recording was featured on their 1967 album Reach Out and is the second most successful cover version, having reached #15 on the soul singles chart, #14 on the Billboard Hot 100, and charting higher than The Left Banke in Canada at #2 on the RPM Magazine charts.  Overseas, it peaked at #3 on the UK Singles Chart and #5 in the Irish Singles Chart in January 1968, The Andantes provided backing vocals on this Motown release in unison with the other Tops.

Personnel
 Lead vocals by Levi Stubbs
 Background vocals by Obie Benson, Duke Fakir, Lawrence Payton, and The Andantes
 Instrumentation by The Funk Brothers

Chart performance

Weekly charts

Year-end charts

Rick Price version

In May 1993, "Walk Away Renée" was released by Australian singer songwriter Rick Price as the fifth single from his debut studio album  Heaven Knows. The song peaked at #21 in Australia.

Weekly charts

References

External links
 Walk Away Renee – Left Banke Machinima Video
 leftbanke.nu
 
 

1966 debut singles
1968 singles
1993 singles
1966 songs
Baroque pop songs
Four Tops songs
The Left Banke songs
Rick Price songs
Smash Records singles
Songs about heartache
Songs about loneliness

Songs about musicians
Cultural depictions of pop musicians
Songs written by Michael Brown (rock musician)
Song recordings produced by Brian Holland
Song recordings produced by Lamont Dozier
Motown singles
Columbia Records singles